Paul Gillard was a British stage and television actor. He appeared in British television series Crane, Knock on Any Door, The Avengers, UFO and others.

Acting credits

References

External links

British male television actors
Possibly living people
Year of birth missing